Cecil Roy Luining (June 28, 1931 – November 20, 1998) was a Canadian football player who played for the Winnipeg Blue Bombers. He won the Grey Cup with them in 1958, 1959, 1961 and 1962. After his football, he was a dairy retailer, a member of the Selkirk City Council, and president of the Gull Lake Ratepayers Association. He died of a heart attack in 1998 after a Grey Cup parade in Winnipeg.

References

1931 births
Canadian football people from Winnipeg
Players of Canadian football from Manitoba
Winnipeg Blue Bombers players
Canadian sportsperson-politicians
Manitoba municipal councillors
1998 deaths